is one of three wards of the city of Shizuoka in Shizuoka Prefecture, Japan, located in the northern part of the city. Aoi-ku borders Suruga-ku in the south and Shimizu-ku to the southeast; the west faces Shimada, Fujieda and Kawanehon and its northern tip extends into the border between Nagano Prefecture and Yamanashi Prefecture.  It is the largest ward in Japan in terms of geographic area. 

Aoi-ku was created on April 1, 2003, when Shizuoka became a city designated by government ordinance (a "designated city"). It consists of the area of Shizuoka prior to its merger with Shimizu, north of the Tōkaidō Main Line rail tracks.

The ward is home to both the Shizuoka city offices as well as the Shizuoka prefectural offices.

Geography

Climate
Aoi-ku has a climate characterized by hot and humid summers, and relatively mild winters (Köppen climate classification Cfa).

Economy
Vic Tokai has its headquarters in Aoi-ku. Fuji Dream Airlines was headquartered in Aoi-ku; it now has its headquarters in Makinohara.

Notes

 

Wards of Shizuoka (city)